Faggots are meatballs made from minced off-cuts and offal, especially pork (traditionally pig's heart, liver, and fatty belly meat or bacon) together with herbs for flavouring and sometimes added bread crumbs. It is a traditional dish in the United Kingdom, especially South and Mid Wales and the English Midlands.

Faggots originated as a traditional cheap food consumed by ordinary country people in Western England, particularly west Wiltshire and the West Midlands. Their popularity spread from there, especially to South Wales in the mid-nineteenth century, when many agricultural workers left the land to work in the rapidly expanding industry and mines of that area.
Faggots are also known as "ducks" in Yorkshire, Lincolnshire, and Lancashire, often as "savoury ducks". The first use of the term in print was in the Manchester Courier and Lancashire General Advertiser of Saturday 3 June 1843, a news report of a gluttonous man who ate twelve of them.

Preparation and serving

Commonly, a faggot consists of minced pork liver and heart, wrapped in bacon, with onion and breadcrumbs. Often, the faggot is cooked in a crock with gravy and served with peas and mashed potato. The mixture is shaped by hand into small balls, wrapped with caul fat (the omentum membrane from the pig's abdomen), and baked. Faggots may also be made with beef.

Another variation of the faggot is pig's fry (testicles) wrapped in pig's caul: the pig's fry and boiled onions are minced (ground) together, then mixed with breadcrumbs or cold boiled potatoes, seasoned with sage, mixed herbs and pepper, all beaten together and then wrapped in small pieces of caul to form a ball. They are baked in the oven, and usually served cold.

Production
The dish gained in popularity during the rationing in World War II, but declined over the following decades. The "nose-to-tail eating" trend has resulted in greater demand for faggots in the 21st century; British supermarket chain Waitrose once again sold beef faggots from 2014 onwards and in 2018 it was estimated that "tens of millions" of faggots were eaten every year. Faggots are often home-made, and are found in traditional butchers' shops and market stalls, though many UK supermarkets stock mass-produced frozen faggots, often made of liver and onions rolled into meatballs in a sauce, different from traditional faggots, which have a coarser texture and contain far less water.

A popular dish is faggots and peas. This combination is common in the Black Country area of the West Midlands. It is still common to see small butchers' shops in the area selling faggots made to their own recipe cheaply.

Double meaning
The use of the word "faggot" has caused misunderstanding due to its American English meaning  as a pejorative term for a homosexual man. In 2004, a radio commercial for the UK supermarket chain Somerfield, in which a man rejects his wife's suggested dinner saying "I've got nothing against faggots, I just don't fancy them" was found to have been innuendo which breached the Advertising and Sponsorship Code and was banned by the industry regulator Ofcom. In November 2013, it was reported that British Facebook users had been blocked temporarily for using the word, in its culinary sense, on the website. Facebook said that the word had been misinterpreted.

See also
Frikadeller
Meatball

References

British cuisine
English cuisine
British pork dishes
Meatballs
Obscenity controversies
Offal
Welsh cuisine